Colobinion is an extinct genus of trilobite in the family Pliomeridae. There is one described species in Colobinion, C. julius.

References

Pliomeridae
Articles created by Qbugbot